Toechima erythrocarpum, also known as pink tamarind and foambark, is a species of plant in the lychee family that is native to Australia and New Guinea.

Description
The species grows as a small tree. The pinnate leaves have leaflets which are up to 23 cm long and 12 cm wide. The small white flowers occur in inflorescences 11.5-27.5 cm long. The red to orange fruits, obovoid-ellipsoid in shape, are about 20–35 mm by 15–32 mm in size.

Distribution and habitat
The species occurs in New Guinea and north-east Queensland, at elevations from sea level to 1150 m, in mature rainforest.

References

erythrocarpum
Flora of Queensland
Flora of New Guinea
Sapindales of Australia
Taxa named by Ferdinand von Mueller
Plants described in 1865